Humphreys House or Humphreys Building may refer to:

in the United States
David C. Humphreys House, Huntsville, Alabama, listed on the National Register of Historic Places (NRHP)
Humphreys-Ryan House, Hot Springs, Arkansas, NRHP-listed, in Garland County
Gen. David Humphreys House, Ansonia, Connecticut, NRHP-listed in New Haven County
Sanford-Humphreys House, Seymour, Connecticut, listed on the NRHP in New Haven County, Connecticut
Sir John Humphreys House, Swampscott, Massachusetts, NRHP-listed
Rosemary-Humphreys House, Greenwood, Mississippi, listed on the NRHP in Leflore County, Mississippi
Humphreys Drugstore Building, Grandfield, Oklahoma, listed on the NRHP in Tillman County, Oklahoma

See also
Humphrey House (disambiguation)